Stella Yeanneth Puñales Brun (born 3 June 1961) is a Uruguayan notary and politician, a member of the Colorado Party.

Biography
Yeanneth Puñales was born in Lascano, Rocha Department, the second daughter of politician  and Mireya Brun.

She was reelected for the term 2000–2005; during that period she was the fourth Vice President of the Chamber of Representatives.

In her parliamentary performance, her participation in the Gender and Equity Commission (which she presided over) stands out, along with her colleagues Glenda Rondán, Beatriz Argimón, Margarita Percovich, and Daisy Tourné. In 2000, Puñales became pregnant during the legislative term, the first member of the Chamber of Representatives ever to do so. She was obligated to request a month of sick leave, as the body had no provisions in place for maternity or paternity leave. The Gender and Equity Commission subsequently presented an initiative to amend the relevant statute for public officials.

Puñales occupies a seat on the National Executive Committee (CEN) of the Colorado Party, and a position of political trust in the Senate.

References

1961 births
Colorado Party (Uruguay) politicians
Living people
Members of the Chamber of Representatives of Uruguay
People from Rocha Department
University of the Republic (Uruguay) alumni
Uruguayan notaries
20th-century Uruguayan women politicians
20th-century Uruguayan politicians
21st-century Uruguayan women politicians
21st-century Uruguayan politicians